Abhijit Chowdhury is a Kolkata, India-based writer and an independent filmmaker whose debut direction is Dwitiyo Ripu which got released on 11 September 2015. In 2018, his short film Mithye was released in a popular Bengali OTT platform Hoichoi where Souman Bose was seen in the leading role.
 
His next release Aste Ladies is a web series streaming in  Hoichoi featuring three ladies in the lead role played by Sandipta Sen, Saayoni Ghosh and Madhurima Ghosh. Abhijit wrote and directed this web series containing 9 episodes which introduced the genre of Crime Comedy for the first time to the Bengali audience.

His next venture, Manbhanjan is also a web series based on a Short story of Rabindranath Tagore. Manbhanjan was released on Hoichoi on 14 June 2019. Sohini Sarkar, Anirban Bhattacharya and Amrita Chattopadhyay played the leading roles in Manbhanjan. Abhijit earned critical success for his web series Aste Ladies and Manbhanjan

.

The Bengali audience got a new pair of detectives, "Johny Bonny", a Suspense-Drama series created by Abhijit, starring Debasish Mondal, Swastika Dutta, Ankit Majumder, Kamaleshwar Mukherjee, and others which streaming on Klikk, a Bengali OTT by Angel Digital.  The director beautifully portrays the life of a Cop and his infinite struggle of how he gets help from his partner in crime for solving the cases with the help of Chess strategies.

Early life and background
Abhijit graduated from Indian Institute of Engineering Science and Technology, Shibpur. He left his job as a software engineer to pursue his Film-making career.

Filmography

References

External links
 Telegraphindia News

Indian filmmakers
Living people
Year of birth missing (living people)
Film directors from Kolkata